Bert Hall  was an English cricketer who played first-class cricket for Derbyshire in 1902.

Hall represented Derbyshire during the 1902 season in one match against Hampshire, a 180-run victory in which Hall put on ten runs in the two innings in which he played.

References

Hall, Bert
Hall, Bert
Year of birth missing
Year of death missing